National Loan and Exchange Bank Building, also known as the Barringer Building, is a historic bank and office building located at 1338 Main Street, Columbia, South Carolina. It was built in 1903, and is a 12-story, steel frame building faced in brick and stone.  It measures 184 feet high and is considered Columbia's first skyscraper. The building was owned by the Barringer Corporation from 1953 until 1974.

It was added to the National Register of Historic Places in 1979.

References

Skyscrapers in South Carolina
Office buildings on the National Register of Historic Places in South Carolina
Bank buildings on the National Register of Historic Places in South Carolina
Buildings and structures completed in 1903
Buildings and structures in Columbia, South Carolina
National Register of Historic Places in Columbia, South Carolina
Skyscraper office buildings in South Carolina
1903 establishments in South Carolina